The 1970 Big Ten Conference football season was the 75th season of college football played by the member schools of the Big Ten Conference and was a part of the 1970 NCAA University Division football season. 

The 1970 Ohio State Buckeyes football team, under head coach Woody Hayes, won the Big Ten football championship, was ranked No. 5 in the final AP Poll, and led the conference in scoring offense (29.0 points per game). The Buckeyes were undefeated in the regular season but lost to Stanford in the 1971 Rose Bowl. Defensive back Jack Tatum and middle guard Jim Stillwagon were consensus first-team All-Americans. Stillwagon also won the Outland Trophy as the best interior lineman in college football. Running back John Brockington led the conference with 102 points scored, received first-team All-American honors from multiple selectors, and was the first Big Ten player selected in the 1971 NFL Draft with the ninth overall pick. Quarterback Rex Kern finished fifth in the voting for the 1970 Heisman Trophy.

The 1970 Michigan Wolverines football team, under head coach Bo Schembechler, was ranked No. 9 in the final AP Poll and led the conference in scoring defense (9.0 points per game). Michigan's only loss was to Ohio State. Offensive tackle Dan Dierdorf was a consensus first-team All-American. Quarterback Don Moorhead and middle guard Henry Hill were selected as the team's most valuable players.

The 1970 Northwestern Wildcats football team, under head coach Alex Agase, tied with Michigan for second place in the Big Ten and was ranked Running back Mike Adamle of Northwestern led the conference with 1,255 rushing yards and received the Chicago Tribune Silver Football as the conference's most valuable player.

Season overview

Results and team statistics

Key
AP final = Team's rank in the final AP Poll of the 1970 season
AP high = Team's highest rank in the AP Poll throughout the 1970 season
PPG = Average of points scored per game; conference leader's average displayed in bold
PAG = Average of points allowed per game; conference leader's average displayed in bold
MVP = Most valuable player as voted by players on each team as part of the voting process to determine the winner of the Chicago Tribune Silver Football trophy; trophy winner in bold

Preseason

Regular season

Bowl games

Post-season developments

Statistical leaders

Passing yards 
1. Mike Rasmussen, Michigan State (1,344)
2. Craig Curry, Minnesota (1,315)
3. Neil Graff, Wisconsin (1,313)
4. Maurie Daigneau, Northwestern (1,228)
5. Don Moorhead, Michigan (1,167)

Rushing yards
1. Mike Adamle, Northwestern (1,255)
2. John Brockington, Ohio State (1,142)
3. Otis Armstrong, Purdue (1,009)
4. Billy Taylor, Michigan (911)
5. Levi Mitchell, Iowa (900)

Receiving yards
1. Larry Mialik, Wisconsin (702)
2. Barry Pearson, Northwestern (552)
3. Doug Dieken, Illinois (537)
4. Paul Staroba, Michigan (519)
5. Gordon Bowdell, Michigan State (495)

Total yards
1. Craig Curry, Minnesota (1,610)
2. Neil Graff, Wisconsin (1,561)
3. Don Moorhead, Michigan (1,535)
4. Mike Rasmussen, Michigan State (1,358)
5. Mike Adamle, Northwestern (1,255)

Scoring
1. John Brockington, Ohio State (102)
2. Billy Taylor, Michigan (66)
3. Eric Allen, Michigan State (60)
3. Mike Adamle, Northwestern (60)
5. Fritz Seyferth, Michigan (48)

Awards and honors

All-Big Ten honors

The following players were picked by the Associated Press (AP) and/or the United Press International (UPI) as first-team players on the 1970 All-Big Ten Conference football team.

Offense

Defense

All-American honors

At the end of the 1970 season, Big Ten players secured three of the consensus first-team picks for the 1970 College Football All-America Team. The Big Ten's consensus All-American was:

Other Big Ten players who were named first-team All-Americans by at least one selector were:

Other awards

Jim Stillwagon of Ohio State received the Outland Trophy as the best interior lineman in college football.

Two Big Ten players finished in the top 10 in the voting for the 1970 Heisman Trophy. They were: Ohio State quarterback Rex Kern (fifth); and Ohio State defensive back Jack Tatum (seventh).

1971 NFL Draft
The following Big Ten players were among the first 100 picks in the 1971 NFL Draft:

References